The 2012 South Dakota Coyotes football team represented the University of South Dakota in the 2012 NCAA Division I FCS football season. They were led by first year head coach Joe Glenn and played their home games in the DakotaDome. This was their inaugural season in the Missouri Valley Football Conference. They finished the season 1–10, 0–8 in MVFC play to finish in last place.

Schedule

References

South Dakota
South Dakota Coyotes football seasons
South Dakota Coyotes football